Myra Brooks Welch (October 12, 1877 – August 11, 1959 Los Angeles, California) was a poet that is known for her Christian poem The Touch of the Master's Hand, which was also adapted into a film.

Personal life
Myra Brooks was born on October 12, 1877, in Farmington Township, Fulton County, Illinois to Mary (née Eshelman) and John W. Brooks. She was the youngest of four other siblings: Charles, David, Frank and Dessie. By 1900, she and her parents had relocated to Independence, Oregon, where she was working as a sales clerk in a store. Around 1901, she married Otis Melvin Welch, who was a clerk in a dry goods store and had two children, Otis and Doris. By 1920, her parents had moved with her and her family and they were all living in La Verne, California.

Welch's most noted poem, The Touch of the Master's Hand was written in 1921 and published on February 26, 1921, in the Gospel Messenger. She published four books of poetry The Years Between (1929), Dorcas (1930), High Songs (1933) and The Touch of the Master's Hand (1941). 
Welch was disabled in a wheelchair from arthritis. Her arthritis later caused her to not be able to play music, such as the organ which she used to play. Her hands were disabled, but she wrote poems on a typewriter by pressing the keys with pencil erasers, despite the pain that it caused. She was named "the poet with the singing soul".

She was a resident of La Verne, California. As a youngster her special joy was playing the organ but this was denied her in later life as she was severely affected by arthritis and spent much of her time in a wheelchair. She wrote with an inverted pencil in each of her gnarled hands and would pick out the words on a typewriter. She said that the joy of her writing outweighed the pain of her efforts.

References

1877 births
1959 deaths
People from Fulton County, Illinois
People from La Verne, California
American women poets
20th-century American poets
20th-century American women writers
American people with disabilities